Wario video games have been developed by several companies, including Nintendo, Suzak, Good-Feel, Treasure and Intelligent Systems.  All Wario video games have been developed for Nintendo video game consoles and handhelds dating from the Game Boy to the seventh generation of video game consoles. The first game to feature Wario was as the antagonist in Super Mario Land 2: 6 Golden Coins; Wario Land: Super Mario Land 3 was the first to feature Wario as a playable character.

The Wario series consists of two separate gameplay-oriented parts: a series of traditional side-scrolling platform games, and a series of party games under the WarioWare moniker. The platform games are a spin-off from the Super Mario Land series of games for the Game Boy. The changes from the Mario Land series, both stylistically and storywise—with anime-style cutscenes and a greedy protagonist—make the games unique from other platformers in the genre. The latest Wario platform game to be released is  Wario Land: Shake It! The WarioWare games are minigame compilations in which the player is required to perform a series of short activities at a quickening pace, with the player having 4 lives. The latest game in the WarioWare series is WarioWare: Get It Together! for the Nintendo Switch, released in 2021.

Wario platforming games

WarioWare games

Individual microgames

Other games

Notes

References

Wario
Wario